Arvind Kumar Singh is an Indian politician from the Samajwadi Party. He is a three-time MLA and was a cabinet minister in the Uttar Pradesh government. He hails from Barabanki.

Singh completed his LLB (graduation) at University of Lucknow and was its former president of student council.

Singh was also the state general secretary of Samajwadi party.

References

1968 births
Living people
Samajwadi Party politicians from Uttar Pradesh
Rajya Sabha members from Uttar Pradesh
People from Ghazipur

https://upvidhansabhaproceedings.gov.in/member?memberId=19421